Richard George Babcock (March 21, 1899 – February 27, 1988) was an American football player, coach and athletic director. He played college football for the University of Michigan from 1923 to 1925 and served as the head football coach at the University of Akron in 1926 and at the University of Cincinnati from 1927 to 1930. He also served as the University of Cincinnati's athletic director from 1927 to 1932.

Early years
Babcock was born in Illinois, and grew up in Royal Oak, Michigan.  In 1918, he was living in River Rouge, Michigan, and working as an electrician for the Great Lakes Engineering Works, a shipbuilding company.  At the time of the 1920 United States Census, he was living in Detroit, Michigan, and working as a hotel clerk.

University of Michigan
Babcock attended the University of Michigan where he played college football for the Michigan Wolverines football team from 1923 to 1925. He was 5 feet, 11 inches tall, and weighed 180 pounds while playing for Michigan. At age 26, he was a starter at tackle for the 1925 Michigan Wolverines football team that outscored its opponents by a combined score of 227 to 3 on the season.  While attending Michigan, Babcock studied education and was a member of the Beta Theta Pi fraternity and of the Sphinx and Michigamua.

Coaching career

Akron
In February 1926, the Municipal University of Akron, now known as the University of Akron, announced that it had chosen Babcock as its new football and track coach.  Babcock let the Akron Zips football team to a 5–2–2 record during the 1926 season.

Cincinnati
In March 1927, Babcock was hired as a professor of athletics and physical training at the University of Cincinnati.  From 1927 to 1930, he was the head football coach of the Cincinnati Bearcats football team, compiling a 12–21–3 record.  At the time of the 1930 United States Census, Babcock was living in Cincinnati with his wife, Aneeta, whom he married in approximately 1929. His occupation was listed as the athletic director of the University of Cincinnati.  In November 1928, Babcock, in his capacity as Cincinnati's athletic director, hired Frank E. Rice, another former University of Michigan athlete, to serve as the Bearcats' head basketball coach.  Babcock continued to serve as Cincinnati's athletic director until the fall of 1932.

Babcock's overall record as a college football head coach was 17–23–5.

Head coaching record

References

1899 births
1988 deaths
American football tackles
Akron Zips football coaches
Cincinnati Bearcats athletic directors
Cincinnati Bearcats football coaches
Michigan Wolverines football players
Sportspeople from Royal Oak, Michigan
Players of American football from Michigan